Sergey Mikhailovich Kucheryanu (born in 1985) is a Russian pole vaulter.

His best performance is 5.81 m (Dessau, 2008) and he also reached 5.72 m twice in 2012 (1st at National Championships in Cheboksary), when he qualified for the London 2012 Olympics.

Between December 2010 and June 2011, Kucheryanu trained in Australia with the financial support of the Australian Institute of Sport. It was expected that he would receive Australian citizenship and represent his new country at the 2012 Olympics. Administrative delays and tougher rules for athletes changing citizenship countered those plans and Kucheryanu eventually returned to Russia, and competed for them at the 2012 Summer Olympics.

References

External links 

1985 births
Living people
Russian male pole vaulters
Olympic male pole vaulters
Olympic athletes of Russia
Athletes (track and field) at the 2012 Summer Olympics
World Athletics Championships athletes for Russia
Russian Athletics Championships winners
Australian Athletics Championships winners
Russian people of Romanian descent